Hydrodynamica (Latin for Hydrodynamics) is a book published by Daniel Bernoulli in 1738. The title of this book eventually christened the field of fluid mechanics as hydrodynamics.

The book deals with fluid mechanics and is organized around the idea of conservation of energy, as received from Christiaan Huygens's formulation of this principle. The book describes the theory of water flowing through a tube and of water flowing from a hole in a container. In doing so, Bernoulli explained the nature of hydrodynamic pressure and discovered the role of loss of vis viva in fluid flow, which would later be known as the Bernoulli principle. The book also discusses hydraulic machines and introduces the notion of work and efficiency of a machine. In the tenth chapter, Bernoulli discussed the first model of the kinetic theory of gases. Assuming that heat increases the velocity of the gas particles, he demonstrated that the pressure of air is proportional to kinetic energy of gas particles, thus making the temperature of gas proportional to this kinetic energy as well.

Notes

Bibliography 
 

1738 books
Physics books
Mathematics books
1730s in science
Mathematics literature
18th-century Latin books